The Sanguine Fan, Op. 81, is a single-act ballet written by Sir Edward Elgar in 1917. It was one of the pieces he composed to raise money for wartime charities, having been asked to write it by his close friend and confidante Lady Alice Stuart-Wortley.

The theme of the ballet was inspired by a scene depicting Pan and Echo that the artist, Charles Conder, had drawn in sanguine on a fan, although the title itself is incidental to the theme. The first performance was part of the revue Chelsea on Tiptoe at the Chelsea Palace Theatre, London on March 20, 1917, and was conducted by the composer. Afterwards he added a further piece, a shepherd's dance, which received its premiere at a second charity performance in May. The piece did not find great favour with the public until the 1960s when the work was rediscovered by the conductor Sir Adrian Boult, who revived it in 1973. It also being the subject of his final performance on 24 June 1978 in a production by London Festival Ballet at the London Coliseum.

An extract from the ballet, "Echo's Dance", as a piano solo, was published by Elkin in 1917.

Notes

References
Moore, Jerrold N. "Edward Elgar: a creative life" (Oxford University Press, 1984)

External links
 
 The Sauguine Fan on the website from Elgar Society
 

Compositions by Edward Elgar
1917 compositions
1917 ballet premieres
Ballets by Edward Elgar